Cecil Randolph Dudgeon (7 November 1885 – 4 November 1970) was a Scottish Liberal Member of Parliament (MP) who joined Oswald Mosley's New Party.

He was elected at the 1922 general election as MP for Galloway, re-elected unopposed in 1923, but was defeated at the 1924 general election. He was beaten again at the by-election in 1925 following the death of his Unionist successor Sir Arthur Henniker-Hughan, but regained the seat at the 1929 general election.

When Parliament was dissolved for the 1931 general election, Dudgeon resigned from the Liberal Party and contested the election as a New Party candidate. He finished 4th of 4 candidates, with 986 votes (a 2.0% share). He did not stand for Parliament again.

References

External links 
 

1885 births
1970 deaths
Members of the Parliament of the United Kingdom for Scottish constituencies
Scottish Liberal Party MPs
UK MPs 1922–1923
UK MPs 1923–1924
UK MPs 1929–1931